Émile Coué de la Châtaigneraie (26 February 1857 – 2 July 1926) was a French psychologist and pharmacist who introduced a popular method of psychotherapy and self-improvement based on optimistic autosuggestion.

Considered by Charles Baudouin to represent a second Nancy School, Coué treated many patients in groups and free of charge.

Life and career
Coué's family, from the Brittany region of France and with origins in French nobility, had only modest means. A brilliant pupil in school, he initially intended to become an analytical chemist. However, he eventually abandoned these studies, as his father, who was a railroad worker, was in a precarious financial state. Coué then decided to become a pharmacist and graduated with a degree in pharmacology in 1876.

Working as an apothecary at Troyes from 1882 to 1910, Coué quickly discovered what later came to be known as the placebo effect. He became known for reassuring his clients by praising each remedy's efficiency and leaving a small positive notice with each given medication. In 1886 and 1887 he studied with Ambroise-Auguste Liébeault and Hippolyte Bernheim, two leading exponents of hypnotism, in Nancy.

In 1910, Coué sold his business and retired to Nancy, where he opened a clinic that continuously delivered some 40,000 treatment-units per annum (Baudouin, 1920, p. 14) to local, regional, and overseas patients over the next sixteen years. In 1913, Coué and his wife founded The Lorraine Society of Applied Psychology. His book Self-Mastery Through Conscious Autosuggestion was published in England (1920) and in the United States (1922). Although Coué's teachings were, during his lifetime, more popular in Europe than in the United States, many Americans who adopted his ideas and methods, such as Maxwell Maltz, Napoleon Hill, Norman Vincent Peale, Robert H. Schuller, and W. Clement Stone, became famous in their own right by spreading his words.

The Coué Method

General
The application of his mantra-like conscious autosuggestion, "Every day, in every way, I'm getting better and better" is called Couéism or the Coué method. Some American newspapers quoted it differently, "Day by day, in every way, I'm getting better and better." The Coué method centered on a routine repetition of this particular expression according to a specified ritual—preferably as many as twenty times a day, and especially at the beginning and at the end of each day.  When asked whether or not he thought of himself as a healer, Coué often stated that "I have never cured anyone in my life. All I do is show people how they can cure themselves."  Unlike a commonly held belief that a strong conscious will constitutes the best path to success, Coué maintained that curing some of our troubles requires a change in our unconscious thought, which can be achieved only by using our imagination.

Although stressing that he was not primarily a healer but one who taught others to heal themselves, Coué claimed to have effected organic changes through autosuggestion.

Self-suggestion
Coué identified two types of self-suggestion: (i) the intentional, "reflective suggestion" made by deliberate and conscious effort, and (ii) the involuntary "spontaneous suggestion", that is a "natural phenomenon of our mental life … which takes place without conscious effort [and has its effect] with an intensity proportional to the keenness of [our] attention". Baudouin identified three different sources of spontaneous suggestion: 
A. Instances belonging to the representative domain (sensations, mental images, dreams, visions, memories, opinions, and all intellectual phenomena);
B. Instances belonging to the affective domain (joy or sorrow, emotions, sentiments, tendencies, passions); 
C. Instances belonging to the active or motor domain (actions, volitions, desires, gestures, movements at the periphery or in the interior of the body, functional or organic modifications).

Two minds
According to Yeates, Coué shared the theoretical position that Hudson had expressed in his Law of Psychic Phenomena (1893): namely, that our "mental organization" was such that it seemed as if we had "two minds, each endowed with separate and distinct attributes and powers; [with] each capable, under certain conditions, of independent action".

Further, argued Hudson, it was entirely irrelevant, for explanatory purposes, whether we actually had "two distinct minds", whether we only seemed to be "endowed with a dual mental organization", or whether we actually had "one mind [possessed of] certain attributes and powers under some conditions, and certain other attributes and powers under other conditions".

Development and origins

Coué noticed that in certain cases he could improve the efficacy of a given medicine by praising its effectiveness to the patient. He realized that those patients to whom he praised the medicine had a noticeable improvement when compared to patients to whom he said nothing. This began Coué's exploration of the use of hypnosis and the power of the imagination.

His initial method for treating patients relied on hypnosis. He discovered that subjects could not be hypnotized against their will and, more importantly, that the effects of hypnosis waned when the subjects regained consciousness. He thus eventually turned to autosuggestion, which he describes as

Coué believed in the effects of medication. But he also believed that our mental state is able to affect and even amplify the action of these medications. By consciously using autosuggestion, he observed that his patients could cure themselves more efficiently by replacing their "thought of illness" with a new "thought of cure". According to Coué, repeating words or images enough times causes the subconscious to absorb them. The cures were the result of using imagination or "positive autosuggestion" to the exclusion of one's own willpower.

Underlying principles
Coué thus developed a method which relied on the principle that any idea exclusively occupying the mind turns into reality, although only to the extent that the idea is within the realm of possibility. For instance, a person without hands will not be able to make them grow back. However, if a person firmly believes that his or her asthma is disappearing, then this may actually happen, as far as the body is actually able physically to overcome or control the illness. On the other hand, thinking negatively about the illness (ex. "I am not feeling well") will encourage both mind and body to accept this thought. Likewise, when someone cannot remember a name, they will probably not be able to recall it as long as they hold onto this idea (i.e. "I can't remember") in their mind. Coué realised that it is better to focus on and imagine the desired, positive results (i.e. "I feel healthy and energetic" and "I can remember clearly").

Willpower
Coué observed that the main obstacle to autosuggestion was willpower. For the method to work, the patient must refrain from making any independent judgment, meaning that he must not let his will impose its own views on positive ideas. Everything must thus be done to ensure that the positive "autosuggestive" idea is consciously accepted by the patient; otherwise, one may end up getting the opposite effect of what is desired.

For example, when a student has forgotten an answer to a question in an exam, he will likely think something such as "I have forgotten the answer". The more they try to think of it, the more the answer becomes blurred and obscured. However, if this negative thought is replaced with a more positive one ("No need to worry, it will come back to me"), the chances that the student will come to remember the answer will increase.

Coué noted that young children always applied his method perfectly, as they lacked the willpower that remained present among adults. When he instructed a child by saying "clasp your hands and you can't open them", the child would thus immediately follow.

Self-conflict
A patient's problems are likely to increase when his willpower and imagination (or mental ideas) are opposing each other, something Coué would refer to as "self-conflict". In the student's case, the will to succeed is clearly incompatible with his thought of being incapable of remembering his answers. As the conflict intensifies, so does the problem: the more the patient tries to sleep, the more he becomes awake. The more a patient tries to stop smoking, the more he smokes. The patient must thus abandon his willpower and instead put more focus on his imaginative power in order to succeed fully with his cure.

Effectiveness
Thanks to his method, which Coué once called his "trick", patients of all sorts would come to visit him. The list of ailments included kidney problems, diabetes, memory loss, stammering, weakness, atrophy and all sorts of physical and mental illnesses. According to one of his journal entries (1916), he apparently cured a patient of a uterus prolapse as well as "violent pains in the head" (migraine).

C. (Cyrus) Harry Brooks (1890–1951), author of various books on Coué, claimed the success rate of his method was around 93%. The remaining 7% of people would include those who were too skeptical of Coué's approach and those who refused to recognize it.

Medicines and autosuggestion
The use of autosuggestion is intended to complement use of medicine, but no medication of Coué's time could save a patient from depression or tension. Coué recommended that patients take medicines with the confidence that they would be completely cured very soon, and healing would be optimal. Conversely, he contended, patients who are skeptical of a medicine would find it least effective.

Criticism
"That Coué's formula could be applied with a minimum of instruction was challenging; and the accounts of Coué's method curing organic disease were just as threatening to the conventional medicine
of the day, as they were inspiring to Coué's devotees" (Yeates, 2016a, p. 19). "Most of us are so accustomed … to an elaborate medical ritual … in the treatment of our ills … [that] anything so simple as Coué's autosuggestion is inclined to arouse misgivings, antagonism and a feeling of scepticism" (Duckworth 1922, pp. 3–4). According to Yeates (2016a, p. 18), although Coué never produced any empirical evidence for the efficacy of his formula and, therefore, his claims had not been scientifically evaluated, three subsequent experimental studies, conducted more than half a century later — i.e., those of Paulhus (1993) — "seem to offer some unexpected support for Coué's claims".

The psycho-medical establishment
According to Yeates (2016a, p. 19), the protests routinely made by those within the psychomedical establishment (e.g., Moxon, 1923; Abraham, 1926) were on one or more of the following grounds:
(1) "Healing of organic disease by 'self-mastery' was impossible! Aside from 'spontaneous remissions' of authentic disease (efficacious vis medicatrix naturæ!), reported 'cures' were either due to mistaken diagnosis (it was never that disease!), or mistaken prognosis (it was always going to get better!). Anyway, even if it had been diagnosed correctly, there was no compelling evidence to suggest that Coué's approach had been in any way responsible for the cure."
(2) "Even if it was true that, in some extraordinary circumstances, healing by 'self-mastery' was possible, Coué's failure to immediately eliminate those with counterproductive limitations — such as, for example, those lacking the required dedication, mind-set, talent, diligence, persistence, patience, etc. — resulted in many (clearly unsuited) individuals mistakenly postponing (otherwise) life-saving operations and delaying (otherwise) radical medical treatment far beyond any prospect of recovery or cure."
(3) "Despite the obvious fact that each 'disease' had a unique cause, a unique history, and a unique (and idiosyncratic) personal impact, Coué treated a wide range of disparate individuals in the same, single group session, in the same way; and, moreover, he treated them without any sort of detailed examination or differential diagnosis."
(4) "The method's central 'magical incantation' — a specific formula, uttered a specific number of times, in a special way, using a knotted string — aroused strong opposition, as it reeked of outmoded superstitious practices and beliefs."

The Press
While most American reporters of his day seemed dazzled by Coué's accomplishments, and did not question the results attributed to his method, a handful of journalists and a few educators were skeptical. After Coué had left Boston, the Boston Herald waited six months, revisited the patients he had "cured", and found most had initially felt better but soon returned to whatever ailments they previously had.

Few of the patients would criticize Coué, saying he did seem very sincere in what he tried to do, but the Herald reporter concluded that any benefit from Coué's method seemed to be temporary and might be explained by being caught up in the moment during one of Coué's events. Whilst a number of academic psychologists looked upon his work favourably, others did not. Coué was also criticized by exponents of psychoanalysis, with Otto Fenichel concluding: "A climax of dependence masked as independent power is achieved by the methods of autosuggestion where a weak and passive ego is controlled by an immense superego with magical powers. This power is, however, borrowed and even usurped".

Memorials
On 28 June 1936, a monument erected to the memory of Coué, funded by worldwide subscription, and featuring a bust of Coué created by French sculptor Eugène Gatelet, was dedicated in St Mary's Park, in Nancy. The bust was stored for safe-keeping during World War II and, post-war, was restored to its former position in 1947.

Works
 How to Practise Suggestion and Autosuggestion
 A book about the life of Emile Coué by Charles Baudouin
 My Method: Including American Impressions
 Self-Mastery Through Conscious Autosuggestion (1922)

References in fiction

 1922: In the same year as the English translation of Self-Mastery Through Conscious Autosuggestion is published, the song I'm Getting Better Every Day (words by Percy Edgar, music by Mark Strong) is released.
 1923: A Swedish translation of Strong's "I'm Getting Better Every Day" is released by entertainer Ernst Rolf, Bättre och bättre dag för dag (Better and better day by day). It is still a popular refrain in Sweden almost a century later.
 1923: The Coué Method is taught in Elsie Lincoln Benedict's How to Get Anything You Want to train the subconscious mind.
 1924: In the Broadway musical "Sitting Pretty" (music by Jerome Kern), in the song "Tulip Time in Sing-Sing", P. G. Wodehouse's lyrics include "I'd sit discussing Coué With my old pal Bat-eared Louie". 
 1926: The Coué Method is mentioned in P. G. Wodehouse's short story, "Mr. Potter Takes a Rest Cure".
 1928: Coué and Couéism are referred to frequently in John Galsworthy's novel The White Monkey from his Modern Comedy trilogy. Fleur Mont (née Forsyte), expecting what her husband (the tenth baronet) keeps referring to as the eleventh, repeats daily "every day in every way my baby's becoming more and more male". Other characters in the novel are also Coué followers, including, rather improbably, the strait-laced and sensible Soames (although he remains sceptical).
 1930: Miss Milsome, in The Documents in the Case, written by Dorothy L. Sayers and Robert Eustace, dabbles in all sorts of self-improvement schemes, including using "In every day ..."
 1934: in Louis-Ferdinand Céline's novel Journey to the End of the Night The protagonist Bardamu thinks "In her despair I sniffed vestiges of the Coue method".
 1946: In Josephine Tey's novel Miss Pym Disposes, the title character, herself a psychologist, refers to Coué with apparent scepticism.
 1948: In Graham Greene's novel, The Heart of the Matter, the narrator dismisses the Indian fortune teller's reading of Inspector Wilson's hand: "Of course the whole thing was Couéism: if one believed in it enough, it would come true."
 1969: In the film The Bed Sitting Room Room (1969), the character "Mate", played by Spike Milligan, repeatedly utters the phrase "Every day, in every way, I'm getting better and better" while delivering a pie.
 1970: The Coué Method is briefly mentioned in Robertson Davies' book Fifth Business; the passage ends with a criticism of Couéism:So Dr. Coué failed for her, as he did for many others, for which I lay no blame on him.  His system was really a form of secularized, self-seeking prayer, without the human dignity that even the most modest prayer evokes.  And like all attempts to command success for the chronically unsuccessful, it petered out.
 1973: The leading character, Frank Spencer (played by Michael Crawford), in the BBC's situation comedy Some Mothers Do 'Ave 'Em, often recites the mantra, on occasion when trying to impress the instructor during a public relations training course.
 1976: In the film The Pink Panther Strikes Again, the mentally-ill Chief Inspector Charles Dreyfus, repeatedly uses the phrase "Every day and in every way, I am getting better, and better" as directed by his psychiatrist.
 1980:  The chorus in the song "Beautiful Boy" — which John Lennon wrote for his son, Sean — makes a reference to Coué's mantra:
Before you go to sleep
Say a little prayer
Every day in every way
It's getting better and better.
 1981: The protagonist in Emir Kusturica's 1981 film Do You Remember Dolly Bell? often recites the mantra as a result of studying hypnotherapy and autosuggestion.
 1992: In Kerry Greenwood's novel, Death at Victoria Dock, investigative detective Phryne Fisher recites the mantra during a particularly trying case.
 1994: In the film Barcelona, Fred Boynton, making light of his cousin Ted's commitment to various business-efficiency techniques, recites the mantra.  Ted quickly dismisses Fred's quote stating that Coué and autosuggestion is today considered "unserious".
 1998: In Nest Family Entertainment's animated children's film The Swan Princess III and the Mystery of the Enchanted Treasure, a character uses the mantra while training for a competition.
 2005: In the HBO drama Six Feet Under (Season 5, episode 4), George Sibley repeats the mantra to Billy Chenowith in discussing the effectiveness of the former's treatment.
 2012: In Boardwalk Empire (season 3, episode 1) the fugitive Nelson Van Alden (played by Michael Shannon), now a salesman, looks into a mirror and repeats to himself the mantra: "Every day, in every way, I am getting better and better".

See also

 Autosuggestion
 Charles Baudouin
 James Braid
 Emmanuel Movement
 Nancy School
 New Thought
 Positive mental attitude
 Johannes Schultz
 The Salpêtrière School of Hypnosis

Footnotes

References 

 Abbott, E.H. 1923. The Druggist from Nancy: II. Monsieur Coué in New York. The Outlook, 133(3), 123-124. 
 Abraham, K. (1926). Psycho-Analytical Notes on Coué's Method of Self-Mastery. International Journal of Psycho-Analysis, 7(2), 190-213.
  Book review: 
 Barcs-Masson M.-L. (1962) Les grands pharmaciens: Emile Coué ['Great Pharmacists: Emile Coué]. Revue d'Histoire de la Pharmacie, 50(175), 365-371. doi=10.3406/pharm.1962.7617
 Baudouin, C. (Paul, E & Paul, C. trans.), Suggestion and Autosuggestion: A Psychological and Pedagogical Study Based on the Investigations made by the New Nancy School, George Allen & Unwin, (London), 1920.
  Google Books: London: George Allen & Unwin Ltd. Other releases at Google Books:  (ID: JeLmtAEACAAJ),  (ID: 6XQqEAyXZFwC),  (ID: PhntnQEACAAJ),  (ID: 4-8NngEACAAJ).
 Centassi, R., & Grellet, G. (1998). Coué Réhabilité: Tous les jours de mieux en mieux ['Coué Rehabilitated: Better and better every day']. Thônex (Switzerland): Vivez Soleil. 
 Coué, E. (1912). De la suggestion et de ses applications ('Suggestion and its Applications'), Bulletin de la Société d'Histoire Naturelle et de Palethnologie de la Haute-Marne, 2(1), pp.25-46.
 Coué, E. (1922a). La Maîtrise de soi-même par l'autosuggestion consciente: Autrefois de la suggestion et de ses applications. ('Mastery of One's Self through Conscious Autosuggestion: Formerly "Suggestion and its Applications"') Emile Coué, (Nancy), 1922.
 Coué, E. (1922b). Self Mastery Through Conscious Autosuggestion. New York, NY: American Library Service. (A complete translation, by unknown translator, of Coué (1922a).)
 Coué, E. (1922c). Self Mastery Through Conscious Autosuggestion. New York, NY: Malkan Publishing Company. (A partial translation of Coué (1922a) by Archibald S. Van Orden).
 Coué, E. (1923). My Method: Including American Impressions. Garden City, NY: Doubleday, Page & Company. 
 Coué, E., & Orton, J.L. (1924). Conscious Auto-Suggestion. London: T. Fisher Unwin Limited.
 Duckworth, J.H. (1922). Autosuggestion and its Personal Application. New York, NY: The James A. McCann Company. 
 Glueck, B., "New Nancy School", The Psychoanalytic Review, Vol.10, (January 1923), pp. 109–112.
 Guillemain, H. (2010), La Méthode Coué: Histoire d'une Pratique de Guérison au XXe Siècle ('The Coué Method: History of a Twentieth Century Healing Practice'). Paris: Seuil.
 Hudson, T.J.,   The Law of Psychic Phenomena: Systematic Study of Hypnotism, Spiritism, Mental Therapeutics, Etc., A.C. McClurg & Company, (Chicago), 1893.
 Huxley, J.S. (1922). M. Coué and Auto-Suggestion. The Beacon, 1(3), 192-196. 
 Mayo, G. (1923). Coué for Children. New York, NY: Dodd, Mead and Company. 
 Moxon, C. (1923). M. Coué's Theory and Practice of Auto-Suggestion. British Journal of Medical Psychology, 3(4), 320-326.
 Noble, A., Lady, of Ardkinglas, M. Coué and Auto-Suggestion. Chatham, Kent: Parrett & Neves. 1924.
 Orton, J.L. (1955). Hypnotism Made Practical (Tenth Edition). London: Thorsons Publishers Ltd.
 Paulhus, D.L. (1993). Bypassing the Will: The Automatization of Affirmations, in D.M. Wegner & J.W. Pennebaker (Eds.), Handbook of Mental Control (pp.573-587). Englewood Cliffs, NJ: Prentice-Hall.
 Rapp, D. (1987). "Better and Better—": Couéism as a Psychological Craze of the Twenties in England. Studies in Popular Culture,10(2), 17-36.
 Westphal, C., & Laxenaire, M. (2012). Émile Coué: Amuseur ou Précurseur? ('Émile Coué: Entertainer or Forerunner?'), Annales Médico-Psychologiques, Revue Psychiatrique, 170(1), pp. 36–38. doi=10.1016/j.amp.2011.12.001
 Yankauer, A., The Therapeutic Mantra of Emile Coué, Perspectives in Biology and Medicine, Vol.42, No.4, (Summer 1999), pp. 489–495. 
 Yeates, Lindsay B. (2016a), "Émile Coué and his Method (I): The Chemist of Thought and Human Action", Australian Journal of Clinical Hypnotherapy & Hypnosis, Volume 38, No.1, (Autumn 2016), pp. 3–27.
 Yeates, Lindsay B. (2016b), "Émile Coué and his Method (II): Hypnotism, Suggestion, Ego-Strengthening, and Autosuggestion", Australian Journal of Clinical Hypnotherapy & Hypnosis, Volume 38, No.1, (Autumn 2016), pp. 28–54.
 Yeates, Lindsay B. (2016c), "Émile Coué and his Method (III): Every Day in Every Way", Australian Journal of Clinical Hypnotherapy & Hypnosis, Volume 38, No.1, (Autumn 2016), pp. 55–79.

External links

 
 
 Human Trinity Hypnotherapy – Biography of Emile Coué
 Emile Coue Non Profit Discussion Forum
 "conscious-autosuggestion"/ Donald Robertson, Émile Coué's Method of "Conscious Autosuggestion"

1857 births
People from Troyes
1926 deaths
French psychologists
French pharmacists
French hypnotists